Rienstra is a surname. Notable people with the surname include:

Ben Rienstra (born 1990), Dutch footballer
Chad M. Rienstra, American professor
Daan Rienstra (born 1992), Dutch footballer
Dick Rienstra (born 1941), Dutch singer and actor
John Rienstra (born 1963), American football player
Allan A. Rienstra (born 1966), Canadian basketball player and reliability leader